Mark Borowiecki (pronounced BOR-vee-ETZ-kee) (born July 12, 1989) is a Canadian professional ice hockey defenceman who is currently playing for the Nashville Predators of the National Hockey League (NHL). He is the first Ottawa native to be drafted by the Senators when he was selected 139th overall in the 2008 NHL Entry Draft. Borowiecki's physical play has earned him the nickname "Boro Cop" since joining the Senators' organization.

Playing career

Amateur
Borowiecki played two seasons of junior hockey with the Smiths Falls Bears of the Central Junior Hockey League (CJHL) from 2006 until 2008. Borowiecki then chose to go to Clarkson University. Borowiecki was selected by the Ottawa Senators in the fifth round (139th overall) of the 2008 NHL Entry Draft. Borowiecki played three seasons with the Golden Knights team in the Eastern Collegiate Athletic Conference, scoring 12 goals and 20 assists. He served as team captain for the 2010–11 season.

Professional

Ottawa Senators
On March 11, 2011, the Ottawa Senators signed Borowiecki to a two-year entry-level contract. He joined the Senators' American Hockey League affiliate, the Binghamton Senators for the remainder of the 2010-11 season. After playing nine regular season games, Borowiecki contributed two assists and eight penalty minutes in twenty-one playoff games as the Senators won the 2011 Calder Cup.

On January 17, 2012, Borowiecki was called up by the Senators and joined the team on a western road trip. On January 19, Borowiecki made his NHL debut in a 4-1 Ottawa victory over the San Jose Sharks. He joined Chris Phillips on the third pairing. Borowiecki was returned to Binghamton one week later.

Following the resolution of the 2012–13 NHL lock-out Borowiecki began the season in Ottawa, replacing the injured Jared Cowen in the Ottawa line-up. His strong physical presence kept him in the line-up. GM Bryan Murray stated that the defenceman's willingness to compete is "out of sight". Borowiecki was returned to Binghamton after six games with Ottawa.

Borowiecki scored his first NHL goal on November 7, 2013 against Carey Price of the Montreal Canadiens. On August 18, 2014, Borowiecki and the Senators agreed to terms on a three-year contract extension worth about $3.3 million.

On October 5, 2017, the Senators re-signed Borowiecki to a two-year, $2.4 million contract extension.

On October 23, 2018, Borowiecki elbowed Boston Bruins' defenceman Urho Vaakanainen during a scrum in the Senators' crease. He was not penalized on the play, but received a one-game suspension for the incident. In his first game back on October 28 against the Vegas Golden Knights, Borowiecki delivered an illegal hit to the head of Cody Eakin. Borowiecki was issued a five-minute major penalty on the play, and given a three-game suspension.

Nashville Predators
On October 9, 2020, Borowiecki was signed as a free agent to a two-year, $4 million contract with the Nashville Predators.

Personal life
Borowiecki married his wife Tara on July 4, 2015. Their son, Miles was born on February 12, 2020.

In a December 2019 off-ice incident in Vancouver, British Columbia, Borowiecki prevented a theft, and attempted a citizen's arrest, earning him the nickname 'Boro Cop.' Borowiecki was shopping for baby clothes and witnessed a man breaking into a car, stealing a backpack. Borowiecki stopped the suspect, retrieving the pack, but the suspect fled.

Career statistics
Bold indicates led league

References

External links
 

1989 births
Living people
Binghamton Senators players
Canadian ice hockey defencemen
Clarkson Golden Knights men's ice hockey players
Ice hockey people from Ottawa
Nashville Predators players
Ottawa Senators draft picks
Ottawa Senators players